Bésame En La Boca is a 1995 Mexican romance and fantasy film directed and written by Abraham Cherem and Ricardo Del Rio, and produced by Humberto Zurita and Christian Bach. The film stars Latin pop singer Paulina Rubio, actors Charlie Masso, Fernando Colunga, Delia Casanova, Dolores Beristáin, and Leonardo García. The film was produced by Televicine and released on June 23, 1995 in Mexico. The plot centers on one young girl as she take an ancestral travel and changes body, finding herself and real love in the process.

Development on the film began in 1994, when Rubio created a concept inspired by Warren Beatty and Buck Henry's film Heaven Can Wait (1978) and Alexander Hall's Here Comes Mr. Jordan (1941), which was later expanded by Humberto Zurita and Christian Bach. Principal filming began in November 1994, and encompassed over a period of two months.

Critics gave mixed reviews to Bésame En La Boca; however, they considered it a better effort of Rubio as actress. Despite the film's response from critics, it was a box office success, Staying on the main billboard for six weeks. According to the website staff of the newspaper El Debate, at that time the film "brought thousands of young people to theaters to enjoy 'La Chica Dorada' [Rubio], who at that time had already placed his first hit "Mío", and [Fernando] Colunga, who was beginning to emerge as a telenovelas actor."

Synopsis
Claudia (Paulina Rubio) is a rich and selfish girl who, after discovering that her boyfriend Arturo (Fernando Colunga) cheated on her with the promise of making her a famous singer, suffers an accident in which she dies. However, when he arrives in heaven two little angels realize that she should not have died and sends her back to Earth, but with the body and life of someone else ...

Cast
 Paulina Rubio as Claudia Romero / Mónica González
 Charlie Masso as Eduardo
 Fernando Colunga as Arturo
 Delia Casanova as Consuelo
 Dolores Beristáin as La abuela
 Kenia Gazon as Elvira
 René Pereyra as Alejandro
 Moisés Iván Mora as Jean
 Leonardo García as Pedro (El Chofer)
 Richard Voll as Dylan
 Claudia Ortega as Mónica González
 Daniel Havid as Benjamín
 Alejandra Padro as Andrea
 Chucho Reyes as Jesús (Barman)
 Humberto Zurita as Gerente de la disuera

External links

Bibliography 
 Raúl Miranda Flores, Del quinto poder al séptimo arte: la producción fílmica de Televisa CONACULTA/Cineteca Nacional, 2006

References

1995 films
1995 comedy-drama films
Mexican comedy-drama films
1990s Mexican films